New Carlisle was a South Shore Line flag stop located at the corner of Arch and Zigler Streets in New Carlisle, Indiana. The station opened circa 1908 and was built by the Chicago, South Bend and Northern Indiana Railway whose line was immediately north of the South Shore Line. Both lines used the station until the Northern Indiana Railway abandoned its South Bend–Michigan City line leaving the South Shore as the sole occupant. The station remained in service on the South Shore Line until July 5, 1994, when it was closed as part of an NICTD service revision which also saw the closure of Ambridge, Kemil Road, Willard Avenue, LaLumiere, and Rolling Prairie.

Future
In 2018, a study was commissioned by the St. Joseph County Redevelopment Commission to look at the possibility of constructing a new station in New Carlisle. The study was conducted by the South Bend engineering firm Antero Group. The study's $100,000 cost was shared by St. Joseph County and NICTD. At the time the study was commissioned, two possible locations were being considered, one on the eastern edge of New Carlisle's "downtown", and another in Olive Township to the east of town.

By January 2019, St. Joseph County began eying land occupied by a mobile home park as a potential station location. The land is located on Michigan Street in the eastern side of New Carlisle, near the city's American Legion post and on the northern side of the South Shore Line tracks. A 2–1 vote by the St. Joseph County Board of approved $8,300 in contracts for the two parcels occupied by the mobile home park to be appraised by firms. By January 2020, it was announced that St. Joseph County was purchasing the 2.67 acre pair of parcels occupied by the now-vacant mobile home park for more than $400,000, with the stated prospect of locating a future South Shore Line station there. By July 2020, the county began leveling the structures on the site. The is a possibility, however, that the land might be used for a purpose other than housing a South Shore Line station.

A station in New Carlisle would likely supplant the existing Hudson Lake station. 

The plans to build a station in New Carlisle are related to a proposed industrial complex that would be situated to the east of New Carlisle, and which has attracted controversy. The plans for a new station are also intended to attract businesses to the area.

The representative of the NICTD board stated in July 2020 that a new station in New Carlisle could take five or more years to materialize, if ultimately pursued at all.

References

Former South Shore Line stations
Former railway stations in Indiana
Railway stations in St. Joseph County, Indiana
Railway stations closed in 1994
Railway stations in the United States opened in 1908